The Gunnison National Forest is a U.S. National Forest covering 1,672,136 acres (2,612.71 sq mi, or 6,766.89 km²)  in Mesa, Gunnison, Hinsdale and Saguache Counties in Western part of the U.S. state of Colorado.  It borders the White River National Forest to the north, the Grand Mesa and Uncompahgre National Forests to the west, the San Isabel National Forest to the east and the Rio Grande National Forest to south. It lies in parts of five counties. In descending order of land area within the forest they are Gunnison, Saguache, Hinsdale, Delta, and Montrose counties.

It shares the Maroon Bells-Snowmass Wilderness with the White River and San Isabel National Forests, and the Collegiate Peaks Wilderness Area with the San Isabel National Forest.

The forest was created by Theodore Roosevelt on June 13, 1905 as the Cochetopa Forest Reserve, and named after explorer John W. Gunnison.  Today it is administered jointly with the Grand Mesa and Uncompahgre National Forests from offices in Delta. There are local ranger district offices located in Gunnison and Paonia.

Wilderness areas
There are seven officially designated wilderness areas lying within Gunnison National Forest that are part of the National Wilderness Preservation System. Five of them lie partially in neighboring National Forests or on land under the jurisdiction of the Bureau of Land Management (as indicated).
 Collegiate Peaks Wilderness (the largest part in San Isabel NF; partly in White River NF)
 Fossil Ridge Wilderness
 La Garita Wilderness (partly in Rio Grande NF)
 Maroon Bells–Snowmass Wilderness (mostly in White River NF)
 Powderhorn Wilderness (mostly on BLM land)
 Raggeds Wilderness (partly in White River NF)
 West Elk Wilderness
Uncompahgre Wilderness (partly in Uncompahgre NF

See also 
 List of U.S. National Forests

References

External links 

Grand Mesa Uncompahgre and Gunnison National Forests (United States Forest Service)

 
National Forests of Colorado
National Forests of the Rocky Mountains
Protected areas of Delta County, Colorado
Protected areas of Gunnison County, Colorado
Protected areas of Hinsdale County, Colorado
Protected areas of Saguache County, Colorado
Gunnison River
Colorado Western Slope
Protected areas established in 1905
1905 establishments in Colorado